Wan Xiaotang (1916 – September 19, 1966) birth name Wan Xingshi, courtesy name Xiaotang, was a People's Republic of China politician. He was born in Qihe County, Shandong Province. He joined the Chinese Communist Party in September 1937. He became Chinese Communist Party Committee Secretary of Tianjin in 1958. At the outbreak of the Cultural Revolution, he was criticized, kidnapped and beaten by the Red Guards and died. The official cause of death was a heart attack.

References

1916 births
1966 deaths
People's Republic of China politicians from Shandong
Chinese police officers
Victims of the Cultural Revolution
Suicides in the People's Republic of China
Chinese politicians who committed suicide
Politicians from Dezhou
People of the Republic of China